DuckDuckGo (DDG) is an internet search engine that emphasizes protecting searchers' privacy and avoiding the filter bubble of personalized search results. DuckDuckGo does not show search results from content farms. It uses various APIs of other websites to show quick results to queries and for traditional links it uses the help of its partners (mainly Bing) and its own crawler. Because of its anonymity, it is impossible to know how many people use DuckDuckGo.

The company is based in Paoli, Pennsylvania, in Greater Philadelphia and had 200 employees . The company name is a reference to the children's game duck, duck, goose.

History 

DuckDuckGo was founded by Gabriel Weinberg and launched on February 29, 2008, in Valley Forge, Pennsylvania. Weinberg is an entrepreneur who previously launched Names Database, a now-defunct social network. Initially self-funded by Weinberg until October 2011, it was then "backed by Union Square Ventures and a handful of angel investors." Union Square partner Brad Burnham stated, "We invested in DuckDuckGo because we became convinced that it was not only possible to change the basis of competition in search, it was time to do it." In addition, Trisquel, Linux Mint, and the Midori web browser switched to use DuckDuckGo as their default search engine. DuckDuckGo gains revenue via advertisements and affiliate programs. The search engine is written in Perl and runs on nginx, FreeBSD, and Linux. DuckDuckGo is built primarily upon search APIs from various vendors. Because of this, TechCrunch characterized the service as a "hybrid" search engine. Weinberg explained the beginnings of the name with respect to the children's game duck, duck, goose. He said of the origin of the name: "Really it just popped in my head one day and I just liked it. It is certainly influenced/derived from duck duck goose, but other than that there is no relation, e.g., a metaphor." DuckDuckGo was featured on TechCrunch's Elevator Pitch Friday in 2008, and it was a finalist in the 2008 BOSS Mashable Challenge.

In 2010, DuckDuckGo began using privacy to differentiate itself from its competitors.

In July 2010, Weinberg started a DuckDuckGo community website (duck.co) to allow the public to report problems, discuss means of spreading the use of the search engine, request features, and discuss open sourcing the code. The company registered the domain name ddg.gg on February 22, 2011, and acquired duck.com in December 2018, which are used as shortened URL aliases that redirect to duckduckgo.com.

By May 2012, the search engine was attracting 1.5 million searches a day. Weinberg reported that it had earned  in revenue in 2011 and had three employees, plus a small number of contractors. Compete.com estimated 266,465 unique visitors to the site in February 2012. On April 12, 2011, Alexa reported a 3-month growth rate of 51%. DuckDuckGo's own traffic statistics show that in August 2012 there were 1,393,644 visits per day, up from an average of 39,406 visits per day in April 2010 (the earliest data available). In a lengthy profile in November 2012, The Washington Post indicated that searches on DuckDuckGo numbered up to 45,000,000 per month in October 2012. The article concluded:"Weinberg's non-ambitious goals make him a particularly odd and dangerous competitor online. He can do almost everything that Google or Bing can't because it could damage their business models, and if users figure out that they like the DuckDuckGo way better, Weinberg could damage the big boys without even really trying. It's asymmetrical digital warfare, and his backers at Union Square Ventures say Google is vulnerable."
GNOME released Web 3.10 on September 26, 2013, and starting with this version, the default search engine is DuckDuckGo.

At its keynote speech at WWDC 2014 on September 18, 2014, Apple announced that DuckDuckGo would be included as an option for search on both iOS 8 and OS X Yosemite in its Safari browser. On March 10, the Pale Moon web browser, starting with version 24.4.0, included DuckDuckGo as its default search engine, as well as listed it on the browser's homepage. In May 2014, DuckDuckGo released a redesigned version to beta testers through DuckDuckHack. On May 21, 2014, DuckDuckGo officially released the redesigned version that focused on smarter answers and a more refined look. The new version added many new features such as images, local search, auto-suggest, weather, recipes, and more.

On November 10, 2014, Mozilla added DuckDuckGo as a search option to Firefox 33.1. On May 30, 2016, The Tor Project, Inc made DuckDuckGo the default search engine for Tor Browser 6.0.

In July 2016, DuckDuckGo officially announced the extension of its partnership with Yahoo! that brought new features to all users of the search engine, including date filtering of results and additional site links. It also partners with Bing, Yandex, and Wikipedia to produce results or make use of features offered. The company also confirmed that it does not share user information with partner companies, as has always been its policy.

On January 23, 2018, DuckDuckGo revamped its browser extension and mobile app in an effort to keep Internet users safe "beyond the search box". The revamped extension and app include a tool for rating websites based on their use of encryption and ad-tracking networks as well as the ability to block ad-tracking networks. The extension also provides Terms of service summaries from Terms of Service; Didn't Read.

In December 2018, it was reported that Google transferred ownership of the domain name Duck.com to DuckDuckGo. It is not known what price, if any, DuckDuckGo paid for the domain name.

On January 15, 2019, DuckDuckGo announced that all map and address-related searches would be powered by Apple Maps, both on desktop and mobile devices.

In March 2019, Google added DuckDuckGo to the default search engine list in Chrome 73.

In July 2021, DuckDuckGo introduced its email forwarding feature Email Protection, which lets users claim an "@duck.com" email address generated by the service. That inbox will receive emails and strip them of data trackers before forwarding them to the user's private email address. The feature launched in beta for users of the DuckDuckGo iOS and Android apps.

, it had 102,704,358 daily searches on average.

On March 1, 2022, in response to the 2022 Russian invasion of Ukraine, DuckDuckGo paused its partnership with Yandex Search. On March 9, 2022, Weinberg said in a tweet that DuckDuckGo will down-rank sites associated with Russian disinformation, a move which some users criticized as censorship and a violation of the search engine's commitment to "unbiased search." DuckDuckGo has defended itself from the criticism, saying that "The primary utility of a search engine is to provide access to accurate information. Disinformation sites that deliberately put out false information to intentionally mislead people directly cut against that utility."

In April 2022, TorrentFreak reported that DuckDuckGo had blocked search results for some major pirating websites, including The Pirate Bay, 1337x and FMovies, as well as video downloading software Youtube-dl. In a statement to Engadget, DuckDuckGo said that The Pirate Bay and Youtube-dl were never removed from its search results if the user searched for those websites using their name or web address. DuckDuckGo also said that there were problems with "site:" search queries used for these websites and other searches and said that the problem had been fixed.

Also in April, DuckDuckGo said that they would protect users from being tracked by Google's Accelerated Mobile Pages framework, stating: "When you load or share a Google AMP page anywhere from DuckDuckGo apps (iOS/Android/Mac) or extensions (Firefox/Chrome), the original publisher's webpage will be used in place of the Google AMP version".

In May 2022, a report from Bleeping Computer by security researcher Zach Edwards found that DuckDuckGo's web browser allowed Microsoft's trackers to continue running while visiting non-DuckDuckGo websites, contrary to Google and Facebook trackers, which were blocked. In response, Weinberg said that "this issue is occurring on browsers and only pertains to non-DuckDuckGo websites.", adding that "When you load our search results, you are completely anonymous, including ads", and that "Unfortunately our Microsoft search syndication agreement prevent us from doing more to Microsoft-owned properties. However, we have been continually pushing and expect to be doing more soon.", adding that "What we're talking about here is an above-and-beyond protection that most browsers don't even attempt to do — that is, blocking third-party tracking scripts before they load on 3rd party websites. Because we're doing this where we can, users are still getting significantly more privacy protection with DuckDuckGo than they would using Safari, Firefox and other browsers."

Features

Search results

DuckDuckGo's results are a compilation of "over 400" sources according to itself, including Bing, Yahoo! Search BOSS, Wolfram Alpha, Yandex, and its own web crawler (the DuckDuckBot); but none from Google. It also uses data from crowdsourced sites such as Wikipedia, to populate knowledge panel boxes to the right of the search results.

Weinberg has refined the quality of his search engine results by deleting search results for companies he believes are content mills, such as eHow, which publishes 4,000 articles per day produced by paid freelance writers, which Weinberg states to be "low-quality content designed specifically to rank highly in Google's search index". DuckDuckGo also filters pages with substantial advertising.

Instant Answers

In addition to the indexed search results, DuckDuckGo displays relevant results, called instant answers, on top of the search page. These Instant Answers are collected from either third party APIs or static data sources like text files. The Instant Answers are called zeroclickinfo because the intention behind these is to provide what users are searching for on the search result page itself so that they do not have to click any results to find what they are looking for. Instant answers are created by and maintained by a community of over 1,500 open source contributors. This community has come to be known as DuckDuckHack. , there were 1236 Instant Answers active.

In the DuckDuckHack documentation, four types of Instant Answers are described: Goodies, Spices, Fatheads, and Longtails. These types of Instant Answer extensions are differentiated by how their data is retrieved. Goodies do not retrieve data from a third party API, whereas Spices do. Goodies instead use some form of the aforementioned static data sources, such as text files or JSON files. Fathead Instant Answers are key-value answers hosted on DuckDuckGo's backend. Fathead key-value pairs function similarly to a trigger for showing the respective Instant Answer. Longtail Instant Answers are full text queries to a DuckDuckGo database of articles. Paragraphs or snippets from any matching articles are returned, and the section that matches the user's query is highlighted.

In March 2023, DuckDuckGo added DuckAssist to Instant Answers. Using large language models from OpenAI and Anthropic, DuckAssist generates answers to users' questions by scanning online encyclopedias (like Wikipedia and Britannica).

Tor access

In August 2010, DuckDuckGo introduced anonymous searching, including an exit enclave, for its search engine traffic using Tor network and enabling access through a "Tor hidden service" (onion service). (deprecated) was the DuckDuckGo v2 onion service on Tor. This allows anonymity by routing traffic through a series of encrypted relays. Weinberg stated: "I believe this fits right in line with our privacy policy. Using Tor and DDG, you can now be end to end anonymous with your searching. And if you use our encrypted homepage, you can be end to end encrypted as well."

In July 2021, DuckDuckGo introduced a new v3 onion service, with a new link: .

Bangs

DuckDuckGo includes "!Bang" keywords, which give users the ability to search on specific third-party websites – using the site's own search engine if applicable. As of August 2020, 13,564 "bangs" for a diverse range of internet sites are available. In December 2018, around 2,000 "bangs" were deleted. Some of them were deleted due to being broken, while others, such as searches of pirated content sites, were deleted for liability reasons.

Business model

DuckDuckGo earns revenue by serving ads from the Yahoo-Bing search alliance network and through affiliate relationships with Amazon and eBay. As a privacy-focused search engine, the ads served on DuckDuckGo are based on keywords and terms of the search query.

The company supports charitable organizations that work to improve privacy, In 2021 they donated US$1M to these causes and had donated $3,650,000 over the previous decade. Major donations for 2021 included $200,000 to the Center for Information Technology Policy, $150,000 to the Electronic Frontier Foundation, $75,000 to European Digital Rights (EDRi) and $75,000 to The Markup.

Source code

Some of DuckDuckGo's source code is free software hosted at GitHub under the Apache 2.0 License, but the core is proprietary. DuckDuckGo also hosts DuckDuckHack, a sister site for organizing open source contributions and community projects. The search engine's Instant Answers are open source and are maintained on GitHub, where anyone can view the source code. As of August 31, 2017, DuckDuckHack was placed on maintenance mode; as such, only pull requests for bug fixes will be approved.

Reception

In a June 2011 article, Harry McCracken of Time commended DuckDuckGo, comparing it to his favorite hamburger restaurant, In-N-Out Burger:
 The bare-bones approach cited in his quote has since changed; for instance, DuckDuckGo now has auto-completion, instant results, and a news tab. McCracken included the site in Times list of "50 Best Websites of 2011."

Thom Holwerda, who reviewed the search engine for OSNews, praised its privacy features and shortcuts to site-specific searches as well as criticizing Google for "track[ing] pretty much everything you do", particularly because of the risk of such information being subject to a U.S. government subpoena. In 2012, in response to accusations that it was a monopoly, Google identified DuckDuckGo as a competitor. Weinberg was reportedly "pleased and entertained" by that acknowledgment.

In November 2019, Twitter CEO Jack Dorsey revealed his preference for using the DuckDuckGo search engine rather than Google, stating, "I love @DuckDuckGo. My default search engine for a while now. The app is even better!". Conservative political commentators Ben Shapiro and Dan Bongino have also endorsed DuckDuckGo.

Traffic

In June 2013, DuckDuckGo indicated that it had seen a significant traffic increase; according to the company's Twitter account, on Monday, June 17, 2013, it had three million daily direct searches. On average during May 2013, it had 1.8 million daily direct searches. Some relate this claim to the exposure of PRISM and to the fact that other programs operated by the National Security Agency (NSA) were leaked by Edward Snowden. Danny Sullivan wrote on Search Engine Land that despite the search engine's growth "it's not grown anywhere near the amount to reflect any substantial or even mildly notable switching by the searching public" for reasons due to privacy, and he concluded "No One Cares About "Private" Search". In response, Caleb Garling of the San Francisco Chronicle argued: "I think this thesis suffers from a few key failures in logic" because a traffic increase had occurred and because there was a lack of widespread awareness of the existence of DuckDuckGo.

Later in September 2013, the search engine hit 4 million searches per day and in June 2015, it hit 10 million searches per day. In November 2017, DuckDuckGo hit 20 million searches per day. In January 2019, DuckDuckGo set a record of 1 billion monthly searches; and in November of the same year, it hit 50 million searches per day. , DuckDuckGo was receiving 102,704,358 queries per day on average. On January 11, 2021, a record of over 102.2 million daily searches was achieved. A new record of 111,703,299 daily searches was set on 17 January 2022. During the year of 2022, DuckDuckGo experienced stagnation and slight downfall when it comes to the number of searches per month. At the end of the year 2022 they removed their traffic stats page.

Internal surveys by DuckDuckGo found that users of DuckDuckGo had a wide variety of political leanings.

DuckDuckGo Private Browser

DuckDuckGo Private Browser is a privacy-oriented web browser available for iOS and Android, it uses WebView (Blink) on Android and WebKit on iOS. DuckDuckGo Private Browser automatically blocks web trackers and upgrades insecure HTTP connections to HTTPS. The Android version has a feature called App Tracking Protection, which when enabled blocks trackers in other Android applications. DuckDuckGo Private Browser is licensed under the Apache 2.0 license.

In April 2022, DuckDuckGo released DuckDuckGo for Mac to beta, a privacy-oriented desktop browser which automatically blocks both web trackers and cookie consent pop-ups. DuckDuckGo chose to use the WebKit rendering engine that underpins Apple's Safari browser rather than the fork of it called Blink used by Chromium, Opera and Brave. Beah Burger-Lenehan, product manager for the Mac app stated: "We are building everything else from scratch. So beyond rendering, all the code is ours – written by DuckDuckGo engineers with privacy, security, and simplicity front of mind. This means we don't have the cruft and clutter that has accumulated in browsers over the years, both in code and design, giving you a modern look and feel and a faster speed."

See also

 Comparison of web search engines
 List of search engines
 Names Database
 Timeline of web search engines

References

External links

 

Internet search engines
Internet properties established in 2008
Companies based in Chester County, Pennsylvania
Internet privacy software
Tor onion services
Perl software
2008 establishments in Pennsylvania
IOS software
Android (operating system) software
Proprietary cross-platform software
American companies established in 2008
Companies' terms of service
Remote companies
MacOS web browsers